In Greek mythology, the Danaïdes, also Danaides or Danaids, were the fifty daughters of Danaus. In the Metamorphoses, Ovid refers to them as the Belides after their grandfather Belus. They were to marry the 50 sons of Danaus' twin brother Aegyptus, a mythical king of Egypt. In the most common version of the myth, all but one of them killed their husbands on their wedding night, and are condemned to spend eternity carrying water in a sieve or perforated device. In the classical tradition, they came to represent the futility of a repetitive task that can never be completed (see also Sisyphus and Ocnus).

Mythology
Danaus did not want his daughters to go ahead with the marriages and he fled with them in the first boat to Argos, which is located in Greece near the ancient city of Mycenae.

Danaus agreed to the marriage of his daughters only after Aegyptus came to Argos with his fifty sons in order to protect the local population, the Argives, from any battles. The daughters were ordered by their father to kill their husbands on the first night of their weddings and this they all did with the exception of one, Hypermnestra, who spared her husband Lynceus because he respected her desire to remain a virgin. Danaus was angered that his daughter refused to do as he ordered and took her to the Argives courts. Lynceus killed Danaus as revenge for the death of his brothers and he and Hypermnestra started the Danaid Dynasty of rulers in Argos. In other versions of the myth, Danaus himself united Hypermnestra and Lynceus instead.

The other 49 daughters buried the heads of their bridegrooms in Lerna and paid funeral honors to their bodies in front of the city. The gods Athena and Hermes purified them at the command of Zeus. Afterwards, they remarried by choosing their mates in footraces (or their father bestowed them to the victors of the athletic contest). Some accounts tell that their punishment in Tartarus was being forced to carry a jug to fill a bathtub (pithos) without a bottom (or with a leak) to wash their sins off. Because the water was always leaking, they would forever try to fill the tub. Probably this myth is connected with a ceremony having to do with the worship of waters, and the Danaïdes were water-nymphs.

The Danaïds and their husbands

Apollodorus 
The list in the Bibliotheca preserves not only the names of brides and grooms but also those of their mothers. A lot was cast among the sons of Aegyptus to decide which of the Danaids each should marry except for those daughters born to Memphis who were joined by their namesakes, the sons of Tyria. According to Hippostratus, Danaus had all these progeny begotten by a single woman, Europa, the daughter of Nilus.

Hyginus 
Hyginus' list is partially corrupt and some of the names are nearly illegible. Nevertheless, it is evident that this catalogue has almost nothing in common with that of Pseudo-Apollodorus. Names with (†) symbol means corrupted entries but annotations from various editors were provided to rationalize their possible names.

Ellis 
A third list was provided by the English antiquarian, Henry Ellis which was derived from Hyginus. The names of the Danaïdes was complete but with new entries and some alteration in the spellings. It can be observed that the names Armoaste and Danaes (Danais), was an addition to complete the list while Scea (Scaea) and Autonomes (Automate) which was obviously borrowed from Apollodorus' accounts were also added.

Other Danaïdes

Several minor female characters, mentioned in various accounts unrelated to the main myth of Danaus and the Danaïdes, are also referred to as daughters of Danaus. These include:

Archedice, along with her sister Helice and two others, chosen by lot by the rest, had founded the temple of Lindian Athene where they made offerings on Lindos in Rhodes.
Anaxithea, mother of Olenus by Zeus.
Amphimedusa, mother of Erythras by Poseidon
Astyoche, a nymph who was called the mother of Chrysippus by Pelops.
Eurythoe, one of the possible mothers of Oenomaus by Ares; alternatively, mother of Hippodamia by Oenomaus
Hippe, who, like her sister Amymone, gave her name to a freshwater source
 Hippodamia, mother of Olenus by Zeus. (Maybe the same as the above Anaxithea)
Isonoe or Isione or Hesione, mother of Orchomenus or Chryses by Zeus.
 Kamira
Phaethusa, one of the possible mothers of Myrtilus by Hermes
Phylodameia, mother of Pharis by Hermes
Physadeia, who, like her sister Amymone, gave her name to a freshwater source
Polydora, nymph-mother of Dryops (Oeta) by the river god Spercheus
Side, mythical eponym of a town in Laconia

Modern literature 

The Daughters of Danaus is also the title of an 1894 novel by Mona Caird, also dealing with imposed marriage although, in this case, it is a single marriage instead of 50, and in 19th-century Great Britain.

In 1910, the Hungarian poet Mihály Babits published his poem The Danaids, translated into English by Peter Zollman and István Tótfalusi.

Magda Szabó's 1964 novel, A Danaida (The Danaid), is about a woman who lives selfishly for two-thirds of her life without realizing that even she can change the course of history.

Le châtiment des Danaïdes is an essay by the French-Canadian author Henri Paul Jacquesthe applying the Freudian concept of psychoanalysis to the study of the punishment imposed on the Danaïdes after they committed their crimes.

In Monday Begins on Saturday, it is mentioned that the Danaïdes had their case reviewed in modern times, and, due to mitigating circumstances (the marriage being forced), had their punishment changed to laying down and then immediately demolishing asphalt.

See also

 Names of the Greeks (Danaans)
 Las Danaides, Alameda Central, Mexico City

Notes

References 

 Antoninus Liberalis, The Metamorphoses of Antoninus Liberalis translated by Francis Celoria (Routledge 1992). Online version at the Topos Text Project.
Apollodorus, The Library with an English Translation by Sir James George Frazer, F.B.A., F.R.S. in 2 Volumes, Cambridge, MA, Harvard University Press; London, William Heinemann Ltd. 1921. ISBN 0-674-99135-4. Online version at the Perseus Digital Library. Greek text available from the same website.
Callimachus. Hymns, translated by Alexander William Mair (1875–1928). London: William Heinemann; New York: G.P. Putnam's Sons. 1921. Online version at the Topos Text Project.
Clement of Alexandria, Recognitions from Ante-Nicene Library Volume 8, translated by Smith, Rev. Thomas. T. & T. Clark, Edinburgh. 1867. Online version at theio.com.
 Hyginus, Fabulae from The Myths of Hyginus translated and edited by Mary Grant. University of Kansas Publications in Humanistic Studies. Online version at the Topos Text Project.
John Tzetzes, Book of Histories, Books VII-VIII translated by Vasiliki Dogani from the original Greek of T. Kiessling's edition of 1826.  Online version at theio.com.
 Pausanias, Description of Greece with an English Translation by W.H.S. Jones, Litt.D., and H.A. Ormerod, M.A., in 4 Volumes. Cambridge, MA, Harvard University Press; London, William Heinemann Ltd. 1918. . Online version at the Perseus Digital Library
Pausanias, Graeciae Descriptio. 3 vols. Leipzig, Teubner. 1903.  Greek text available at the Perseus Digital Library.

 
Princesses in Greek mythology
Condemned souls in Tartarus
Denyen
Deeds of Athena
Deeds of Zeus